Nomenclature of Territorial Units for Statistics or NUTS is a geocode standard for referencing the administrative divisions of countries for statistical purposes. The standard, adopted in 2003, is developed and regulated by the European Union, and thus only covers the EU member states in detail. The Nomenclature of Territorial Units for Statistics is instrumental in the European Union's Structural Funds and Cohesion Fund delivery mechanisms and for locating the area where goods and services subject to European public procurement legislation are to be delivered.

For each EU member country, a hierarchy of three NUTS levels is established by Eurostat in agreement with each member state; the subdivisions in some levels do not necessarily correspond to administrative divisions within the country. A NUTS code begins with a two-letter code referencing the country, as abbreviated in the European Union's Interinstitutional Style Guide. The subdivision of the country is then referred to with one number. A second or third subdivision level is referred to with another number each. Each numbering starts with 1, as 0 is used for the upper level. Where the subdivision has more than nine entities, capital letters are used to continue the numbering. Below the three NUTS levels are local administrative units (LAUs). A similar statistical system is defined for the candidate countries and members of the European Free Trade Association, but they are not part of NUTS governed by the regulations.

The current NUTS classification, dated 21 November 2016 and effective from 1 January 2018 (now updated to current members ), lists 92 regions at NUTS 1, 244 regions at NUTS 2, 1215 regions at NUTS 3 level, and 99,387 local administrative units (LAUs).

National structures
Not all countries have every level of division, depending on their size. For example, Luxembourg and Cyprus only have local administrative units (LAUs); the three NUTS divisions each correspond to the entire country itself.

Member states

Candidate countries

EFTA countries

Former EU state

Maps

Establishment
NUTS regions are generally based on existing national administrative subdivisions. In countries where only one or two regional subdivisions exist, or where the population of existing subdivisions is too small or too large, a second and/or third level is created. This may be on the first level (ex. France, Italy, Greece, and Spain), on the second (ex. Germany) and/or third level (ex. Belgium). In countries with small populations, where the entire country would be placed on the NUTS 2 or even NUTS 3 level (ex. Luxembourg, Cyprus), the regions at levels 1, 2 and 3 are identical to each other (and also to the entire country), but are coded with the appropriate length codes levels 1, 2 and 3.

The NUTS system favors existing administrative units, with one or more assigned to each NUTS level.  Specific guidelines are based in population, leaving little or no role for other types of variables such as area, distance, topography, levels of jurisdiction or history, which can only be considered in (unspecified) types of special cases. From the NUTS Regulation, the average population size of the regions in the respective level shall lie within the following thresholds:

For non-administrative units, deviations from these population marks exist for particular geographical, socio-economic, historical, cultural or environmental circumstances, especially for islands and outermost regions.

Examples
 IT: Italy
 ITC: Northwest Italy
 ITC1: Piedmont
 ITC11: Metropolitan City of Turin

See also
 ISO 3166
 ISO 3166-1
 ISO 3166-2
 List of FIPS region codes
 List of metropolitan areas in Europe by population
 List of metropolitan areas (LUZ) in the European Union
 List of the largest urban areas of the European Union
 List of European regions by GDP
 Regions of the European Union

References

External links

 Eurostat portal – NUTS – Nomenclature of territorial units for statistics – Overview
 History of NUTS – Changes between versions
 NUTS maps
 Statistical regions outside the EU
 Correspondence between the NUTS levels and the national structures (EU)
 Correspondence between the NUTS levels and the national structures (non-EU)
 List of current NUTS codes at SIMAP (EU procurement portal)
 NUTS regions for web maps in JSON format
 NUTS classification as Linked Data
 Administrative Divisions of Countries ("Statoids")

 
Geocodes
Statistical data coding